The 1998 South American Women's Football Championship (Campeonato Sudamericano de Fútbol Femenino 1998) was held in Mar del Plata, Argentina between March 1 & 15. It was the third staging of the Sudamericano Femenino and determined the CONMEBOL's qualifiers for the 1999 FIFA Women's World Cup.

This was the first Sudamericano Femenino to feature all 10 CONMEBOL confederations' women's national teams. Brazil won the tournament for the third time after beating Argentina 7–1 in the final. Brazil qualified directly to the Women's World Cup and Argentina faced Mexico in two play-off matches for qualification.

Argentina was confirmed as hosts in November 1997.

Venue 
The only venue used for the tournament was the Estadio José María Minella, located in Mar del Plata.

Officials
The following referees were named for the tournament:

 Claudio Martín
 Edgar Solíz
 Rubén Selman
 Martha Toro
 Rafael Jarrín
 Oliver Viera

Results 
The ten teams were divided into two groups of five teams each. The top two teams in the groups advanced to the semi-finals. The winner of the tournament qualified for the 1999 FIFA Women's World Cup in the United States.

Three points were awarded for a win, one point for a draw, and zero points for a loss.

 Tie-breaker
 If teams finish leveled on points, the following tie-breakers are used:
 greater goal difference in all group games;
 greater number of goals scored in all group games;
 winner of the head-to-head match between the teams in question;
 drawing of lots.

Group stage

Group A

Group B

Knockout stage

Bracket

Semi-finals

Third place playoff

Final

Brazil won the tournament and qualified for the 1999 FIFA Women's World Cup. Argentina advanced to the CONMEBOL/CONCACAF Intercontinental play-off.

Awards

Statistics

Goalscorers
16 goals
 Roseli
5 goals
  Olienka Salinas 
4 goals

 Kátia
 Sandra Valencia
 Irma Cuevas

3 goals

 Karina Morales
 María Villanueva
 Lara González

2 goals

 Liliana Baca
 Sandra Núñez
 Yanina Gaitán
 Pretinha
 Suzana
 Macarena Lazo
 Susana Quintana

1 goal

 Julia Achával
 Marisa Gerez
 Fabiana Ochotorena
 Fernanda Trujillo
 Cidinha
 Elane
 Elsi
 Formiga
 Maycon
 Nenê
 Sissi
 Ximena Alburquerque
 Sonia Chala
 Luz Grisales
 Miriam Giménez
 Viviana Arce
 Rossana Hoyle
 Carla Arrúa
 Rossana Soria
 Milagros Infante

Unknown goalscorers

: 2 additional goals
: 35 additional goals
: 5 additional goals
: 5 additional goals
: 14 additional goals
: 1 additional goal
: 4 additional goals
: 1 additional goal

References

External links
Tables & results at RSSSF.com

Copa América Femenina tournaments
Women
1999 FIFA Women's World Cup qualification
International association football competitions hosted by Argentina
Sud
South
March 1998 sports events in South America